The Song Diaries is a compilation album by English singer Sophie Ellis-Bextor, released on 15 March 2019 by EBGB's. Made in collaboration with Ed Harcourt, the album consists primarily of orchestral versions of Ellis-Bextor's solo singles, including her collaboration with Italian DJ Spiller, "Groovejet (If This Ain't Love)", and a song from her time as part of Theaudience, "A Pessimist Is Never Disappointed". It was called an "orchestral greatest hits" by Clash. Ellis-Bextor will tour the UK with a full orchestra and band in support of the album from June 2019.

Background
Plans for and the beginning of recording for the album were first announced on PledgeMusic in December 2017. Throughout the recording process, Sophie posted videos and snippets of the songs she was working on plus commentaries on the work in progress, both on PledgeMusic and her social media.

Concept
The Official Charts Company stated that due to the immediate availability of an artist's back catalogue in the streaming era, "the concept of a greatest hits has changed, with many artists opting to re-work their hits to give them a fresh spin", comparing it to Take That's 2018 greatest hits Odyssey.

Track listing
All tracks produced by Ed Harcourt, except "Love Is You" produced by Richard "Biff Stannard and Ash Howes of Biffco.

Charts

References

2019 compilation albums
Sophie Ellis-Bextor albums
Cooking Vinyl compilation albums